This partial list of languages is sorted by a partial count of phonemes (generally ignoring tone, stress and diphthongs). Estimates of phoneme-inventory size can differ radically between sources, occasionally by a factor of several hundred percent. For instance, Received Pronunciation of English has been claimed to have anywhere between 11 and 27 vowels, whereas West ǃXoon has been analyzed as having anywhere from 87 to 164 consonants. 

Languages at the low end of the spectrum (Piraha, Rotokas) and especially the high end (Ubykh, Gǀui, ǂʼAmkoe for consonants, Wobe etc. for tones) are omitted.

List

This list features standard dialects of languages. The languages are classified under primary language families, which may be hypothesized, marked in italics, but do not include ones discredited by mainstream scholars (e.g. Niger–Congo but not Altaic). Dark-shaded cells indicate extinct languages. The parenthesized righthand side of expressions indicates marginal phonemes.

See also
UCLA Phonological Segment Inventory Database

Footnotes

References

number of phonemes